Michelbach (Saar) is a small community in the Saarland, Germany, with about 1000 citizens. It is part of the municipality of Schmelz (Saar), and is situated in the district of Saarlouis. It's near the gate of the Hochwald region of the Saarland.

Towns in Saarland